The Dangerous Drugs (Special Preventive Measures) Act 1985, is a Malaysian laws which enacted to provide for the preventive detention of persons associated with any activity relating to or involving the trafficking in dangerous drugs.

Preamble
Preamble of the Act provides the following considerations:
WHEREAS action which is prejudicial to public order in Malaysia has been taken and further similar action is being threatened by a substantial body of persons both inside and outside Malaysia;
AND WHEREAS Parliament considers it necessary to stop such action;

Structure
The Dangerous Drugs (Special Preventive Measures) Act 1985, in its current form (1 January 2006), consists of 2 Parts containing 25 sections and no schedule (including 4 amendments).
 Part I: Preliminary
 Part II: Powers of Preventive Detention

References

External links
 Dangerous Drugs (Special Preventive Measures) Act 1985 

1985 in Malaysian law
Malaysian federal legislation